This Morning With Richard Not Judy or TMWRNJ  is a BBC comedy television programme, written by and starring Lee and Herring. Two series were broadcast in 1998 and 1999 on BBC Two. The name was a satirical reference to ITV's This Morning which was at the time popularly referred to as This Morning with Richard and Judy.

The show was a reworking of old material from their previous work together (radio and TV) along with new characters. Presented in a daytime chat show format in front of a live studio audience, the programme also featured a number of pre-recorded location sketches. It was structured by the often strange obsessions of Richard Herring; examples include his rating of the milk of all creatures and attempting to popularise the acronym of the show (TMWRNJ) (in the style of Tiswas). The show featured (and acknowledged its use of) repetition, with regular and vigilant viewers being rewarded by jokes that would make no sense to casual viewers. The show seemed to oscillate between the intellectual and puerile. However, irony was often used, even though the citing of irony as an excuse was mocked by the show's stars in one of many self-referential jokes.

The actor Kevin Eldon also reprised two of his characters from the earlier Lee & Herring series Fist of Fun, Simon Quinlank (the "King of Hobbies") and his portrayal of "the false Rod Hull" as a jelly fanatic with a false arm and giant chin. A run of sketches featuring Eldon as the false Rod Hull was filmed for the second series, but dropped when the real Rod Hull died just prior to the start of the series. A new sketch was filmed as a tribute and featured as the closing item of the last programme in the series. (Rod Hull had taken this in good humour and had featured in one episode of Fist of Fun as a guest, pouring scorn on the false Rod Hull.)

TMWRNJ was the subject of many complaints on Points of View, largely due to the surprisingly adult content for a programme shown at Sunday lunchtime. The Jesus sketches were much remarked upon on Points of View due to the time of broadcast and uncertainty as to whether they were making fun of Jesus or people's take on the scriptures themselves. Like Fist of Fun it remains a cult series fondly remembered by fans.

Regular features: Series 1 and 2

The Curious Orange
Questions about life from a gigantic talking orange, played by Paul Putner. The name is derived from the album I Am Kurious Oranj by The Fall (itself a reference to the film I Am Curious (Yellow)), which was used to introduce each Curious Orange segment.  At the end of the first series, having been revealed to be Richard Herring's illegitimate son, he was crushed to death and "juiced", but he was later reconstituted by a mad scientist. Throughout the second series his behaviour became increasingly sinister, and for a while he was replaced by The Curious Alien (in truth due to Putner's commitments elsewhere). By the final episode, he had mutated into a tyrannical character reminiscent of Doctor Who'''s Davros (though "just different enough not to infringe any copyright laws").

Histor's Eye
Ostensibly an extremely low-budget Sky TV children's television programme featuring two pirate crows: the titular Histor (who concealed a multicoloured spinning eye beneath his eyepatch) and his hapless first mate Pliny Harris. Histor's ability to transport himself and Pliny through time ("as the crow flies") to view past events would be used to satirise current affairs, and the script would be peppered with deliberately weak but dense nautical- and bird-related multiple puns, which would increase in volume and weakness as the series progressed. (For example, Pliny would say 'Egg feather bird oeuf tit' in place of 'I've never heard of it', or 'Feather me wingers' in place of 'Shiver me timbers'.) Pliny's idiocy drives Histor to insanity and, eventually, he murders him by stuffing him with eggs until he bursts, as he keeps using the word "egg" so it has no connection or relation to the context of what Histor was saying, (only for Histor to be subsequently haunted by Pliny's equally pun-obsessed ghost). A running joke in this segment was that despite Pliny's apparent idiocy, he would occasionally counter Histor's right-wing views with extraordinarily eloquent and well constructed left-wing arguments. This would often result in Pliny being physically attacked by Histor or a third party (e.g. having a broken glass shoved into his face by a "lager lout" Saint George).

Another running gag not featured in the fictional show, but would be part of its introduction, would be a sketch in which Herring naively complains about a recent report in the media, only for Lee to try to correct him before realising the best way to make him understand better is showing him "An educational film for the under fives" he taped from cable TV. After the segment Lee would ask Herring if that cleared the matter up for him, with Herring praising the crows for this saying he now understands. Indeed, Herring once points out that the same joke is always told every week before showing the latest episode, shortly after Lee told him that telling the same jokes soon wears off, with the episode of "Histor's Eye" being focused on that topic. The gag was less frequent in the second series.

Musical Interludes
Richard Thomas played keyboards every week on the show and in series 1 would play a hymn at the end of the show.

Pause for Thought for the Day
The Unusual Priest, played by Kevin Eldon, would present ethical dilemmas, dealing with them in increasingly ridiculous fashion. Based on a character called Monsignor Treeb-Lopez originally created by Lee and Herring for the satirical radio news show On The Hour.

When Insects Attack
A parody of the show When Animals Attack!, with a voice-over supposedly by actor Greg Evigan (actually Mark Gatiss). The last episode of this segment, in the first series, saw The Lettuce Family attacked by a slug, which Evigan points out is a mollusc and not an insect. In the second series this was replaced by When Things Get Knocked Over, Spill, or Fall Out of Cupboards.

King (or Queen) of the Show
In each edition, a member of the audience would be crowned "King (or Queen) of the Show", either at random or as a reward for sending in an especially entertaining letter. After being crowned, they would be offered various items from a trolley; these items would all be linked by the current theme of the show. The crown and trolley would be brought on by the normally mute ("We can't afford to pay you to speak") Trevor and Nathalie (Trevor Lock and Nathalie Brandon) who would sometimes be dressed in outlandish costumes. At this point Trevor would invariably be mocked by Stew for having "a small face".

Richard Herring would use this segment of the show as an opportunity to swear live on Sunday morning TV. Each week it would be varied. For example, he would chant "There's only one King. One King. Wan King. Wanking!" On another week, imitating a trumpet, "Fa fa fa fa, King! Fa fa fa fucking!"

Trevor and Nathalie
A man with 'an extremely small face', called Trevor (comedian Trevor Lock), and a woman called Nathalie, played by Nathalie Brandon, would appear on each show in non-speaking roles as slaves, often to bring in props or to usher in guests or other performers.

The Five Aims
Every week, Rich and Stew discussed five aims they wanted to implement before the end of the series, a parody of New Labour's pledge cards from the 1997 General Election. (The aims were different every week).

Regular features: Series 1

The Profit Making Phone Opinion Poll
Each week the show staged a phone-in which was purely designed to make money for Lee and Herring.  The phone-in was hosted by 'Jo Unwin and the actor Kevin Eldon' and tackled issues which dominated the week's news.  The phone-in would present viewers with three options to the topical question, of which one would be phrased in a style similar to "I agree, but trivial phone opinion polls about such important issues are morally offensive."

The Ironic Review
A fly-on-the-wall documentary about a so-called cutting edge magazine. The item was ostensibly a satire of The Modern Review, with the journalists being in bitter competition to see who could write the most "ironic" article.

Men of Achievement 1974
A short item in which the details of an entry in the book of the same name would be read out. At one point, it was noted as the least popular part of the show, but to be kept in 'until it becomes so popular, it gets its own series'. Men whose entries were read included Harold Warner Munn, Robin Dudding, and Moritz Jagendorf.
Men of Achievement 1974 was first mentioned in the TV version of Fist of Fun as an item Richard Herring had shoplifted from a charity shop.

The School
A fly on the wall documentary focussing on two teachers and their attempts to teach English at a secondary school. Mr Keith Harris (Herring) is an old fashioned teacher described as a 'good man' by the head master who is abused by his students and enjoys nothing more than marking. Mr Ian Kennedy (Lee) is a rogue teacher who constantly attempts to rock the establishment. He is described as 'a fuckwit' by the head teacher.

Roger Crowley
The self-styled most evil man alive, played by Roger Mann. During the first series he would regularly break into the programme to outline his latest absurd plan for world domination. Based on Aleister Crowley (evident in the costume's triangular hat).

The Organ Gang
Also known as TOG, in keeping with Richard's unhealthy abbreviation obsession – A spoof children's series, drawn by Joseph Champniss and narrated by Brian Cant, in which the characters were all organs of the human body, they would have some adventure and end up "laughing for a whole five minutes." It bore some resemblance to the real children's series The Garden Gang in which all the characters were fruit and vegetables. The final episode saw Brian Cant ranting at his duty of being the narrator saying I'm Brian Cant!.

Special Guests
The first series featured guests who were interviewed in a talk show fashion including Mel & Sue, Jenny Eclair, Peter Baynham and Jack Docherty (who claimed to have had sex with Morwenna Banks while she was dressed as her 'little girl' character from Absolutely).

Regular features: Series 2

Sunday Heroes
A series of sketches featuring Jesus and his disciples as the main characters, parodying a schoolteacher and his class. In one sketch per week a disciple would pose a question to Jesus (Lee), usually on a topic of importance that would split Christianity (e.g. Transubstantiation vs Transignification). Instead of answering directly He would make a vague comment (such as instructing them to "consider the lily"), pause, then say "ahh" in a mysterious manner, causing all but Matthew (Herring) to "ahh" along with Him, leading the disciple to become frustrated with the evasion ("This isn't an 'ahh' situation"; "Ahh!"; "No, not 'ahh' – you can't just say 'consider the lily'"; "Ahh!"; "No Jesus: Not 'ahh'.")  Peter (Carlton Dixon) would insult Matthew for not understanding, insisting in a smug "class swot" manner that he "got it right away", and Judas (Eldon) would also laugh at double entendres, only to be admonished.  The other Apostles were played by Paul Putner ("Doubting Thomas"), Trevor Lock (Thaddaeus) and TV's Emma Kennedy (the fictional Ian, who only started following Jesus as he misunderstood the phrase "fishers of men"). These sketches tended to cause some controversy given the time of the show and the day of its broadcast.

The Corrs Shrine
A shrine to the Corrs or more correctly 'The Corrs Shrine'. Essentially Herring's infatuation with Andrea Corr. The rest of them (particularly the "Man Corr") he didn't care for, a joke based on the similar looks of the Corr sisters.

Extra Final Scene
This would take the form of a tacked-on ending for a different film each week, for example as extra final scene for Blues Brothers 2000 which saw Dan Aykroyd and John Goodman laughing and urinating on the grave of John Belushi before driving off in the Bluesmobile. Another was made for Titanic, in which Leonardo DiCaprio's character swims to the surface after Kate Winslet is rescued to celebrate finally escaping her clutches.

Angus Deayton's Authorised History Of Alternative Comedy (with Angus Deayton)
A satirical version of a BBC series that explored the boom in alternative comedy in the 1970s and early 1980s. The item would involve a comedian (either the portrayal of a real life person or a generic stand-up) reminisce about the "amazing times" they had, while shamelessly exaggerating their trailblazing influence. The characters would always be seen drinking from an SDP mug, a reference to the political party famously supported by John Cleese (whose picture appeared on the title screen) during the 1980s. Angus Deayton himself did not appear.

Curious Alien
In series 2 the Curious Orange was replaced by the Curious Alien as Stew became increasingly frustrated with the Orange's behaviour.

Rich's Robbie Williams Tattoo
Rich becomes obsessed with Robbie Williams as a result of his alleged relationship with Andrea Corr.  To display his love for the former Take That member Rich draws a felt tip pen tattoo on his stomach in the shape of Robbie Williams.

Nostradamus and his horse David Collins
A regular feature in the second series, medieval seer Nostradamus (played by TV's Emma Kennedy with a false beard, a "flighty" horse called David Collins and, for no adequately explored reason, a Welsh accent) would give his predictions for the week ahead, which would often be either completely absurd or extremely vague. The start of the segment would look at the previous week's predictions: if they were not correct, Nostradamus would be punished by a nipple cripple, or something similarly pseudo-sexual, by Richard. During one episode Richard obsessed about cress for a whole show, as a spoof of product placement deals. When Nostradamus only got one out of three predictions correct, a barbecue of cress was burnt with a blowlamp.

As the series progressed, it became clear that there was sexual tension between Herring and Nostradamus, the latter openly enjoying the physical punishments handed out by the former. Herring believed their love to be forbidden since both were "men".

Richard Herring's Food and Milk
A weekly segment in which Richard Herring would taste a different milk (shrew, tapir, blue whale, Jesus milk, American beaver milk, the milk of human kindness) and give a rating out of ten. Despite the name no solid food was ever featured in this piece (although Golden Grahams also featured elsewhere on the show several times, apparently to ensure this unloved cereal did not go unnoticed in the UK).  He would end with the line "Remember, there'll always be milk". According to Stewart Lee, the five-second opening jingle that plays when the milk of the week is announced comes from a piece by avant-garde composer Harrison Birtwistle. The producers doctored the frequencies to make the already abrasive noise sound much louder than anything else, to be jarring to hungover viewers.

Lazy Comedy Slags
Lee and Herring would discuss lazy comedy clichés, such as jokes that end by revealing an incongruous fact and jokes designed to play on the audience's sense of nostalgia for the 1970s.
During one episode they also brainstormed lazy comedy ideas for the BBC. Their ideas would usually include characters called Ian – a running joke which also featured in Sunday Heroes, with one of the disciples being called Ian. Proposed programmes included:
Roll Reversall
Ian Roll is a driving instructor, Ian Reversall is a baker. Due to some kind of accident they are forced to swap jobs. With hilarious consequences.
Pie In The Sky
Ian Pie is the landlord of the Sky pub. In an attempt to attract custom each week he buys a different giant pie which goes wrong and ironically scares the public away. With hilarious consequences.
Myy Cup Upstairs
Ian Myy lives in a flat. His upstairs neighbour borrows one of his cups and then doesn't return it. The series details Ian Myy's contrived and failed attempts to get back the cup that is rightfully his.
Babes In The Wood
Two babies live in a piece of wood. Simple but brilliant.

Lazy TV Executive Twits
Lee and Herring discussed the laziness of TV executives after Rich received an offer from Channel 5 to make a programme about fishing due to his surname. They decided to submit some ideas to Channel 5 themselves, which included:
Hugh Fearnley-Whittingstall's Huge Furry Wishing Stall
Hugh Fearnley-Whittingstall tours the country in a gigantic mink lined stall granting peoples' wishes.
Fox watch with Dr Fox
Dr Fox hides a secret camera in the toilet of small American actor Michael J. Fox and watches him go about his daily ablutions.
Jeremy Paxman's Pacman
Jeremy Paxman goes round the country on a moped playing the early arcade game Pac-Man. He is not allowed to leave any town until he has clocked up the highest score for that machine.
Van Outen's Van Outings
Denise Van Outen goes out in a van and meets other people with 'Van' in their name and outs them as homosexual.  Whether they are or not.

Quotes
"Curse you, God, for making me this way!" – A feature of a recurring theme in the series, where someone would be laughed at (in a surreal fashion) due to a misfortune.  The victim of the ridicule would always say this, while shaking his or her fists at the sky.

"My expectations were confounded and from thence the humour arose."

"Who is the real sick man in this so called society?" A question posed by Herring throughout the first series to justify his outrageously inappropriate and perverse personal anecdotes such as:
"Wanting to make love to an animal with the body of Natalie Imbruglia and the head of an ant."
He would compare his activities to those of
"the businessman, in his suit and tie, having sex with the same woman, his wife, every day of his life for 40 years."
It was always concluded by Lee that Herring was clearly the more sick.

"Look at his little face, it's almost as if he understands."

"Saying it in a staccato fashion doesn't make it any more true."

"No, listen to the question and the words in it..."

Transmission details
Number of episodes: 18
Running-time: 45 minutes
Series 1 (8 episodes): 15 February – 5 April 1998 – BBC Two, Sundays at 12.15
Series 2 (10 episodes): 21 March – 13 June 1999 – BBC Two, Sundays, mostly at 12.15
Shortened (30-minute) repeats of the programmes were aired by BBC Two on the Friday following each original broadcast

Reunions

Lee & Herring at Tedstock (Bloomsbury Theatre), 5 February 2007
Stewart Lee and Richard Herring reformed their act after a period of eight years to perform a brief selection of their old material at Tedstock 2007, at the Bloomsbury Theatre, London. Self-mocking and sarcastic as ever, the pair opened with a pastiche of the Mitchell and Webb PC vs. Mac adverts shown that year, which then led on to a rant by Rich that "It should have been us Stew!"

TMWRNJ Reunion Show at The Lyric, Hammersmith Nov 2008
Lee and Herring performed a 40-minute selection of their TMWRNJ material at a 'reunion gig' at the Lyric Hammersmith in November 2008. Their approach to the material was characteristically sarcastic and self-referential, with both comedians ruthlessly deriding their own classic routines even down to points of language and grammar – despite Herring insisting that "You can't question the text! This is like Shakespeare!"

Both comedians fell into their old double act with relative comfort. Much humour was drawn both from the passage of time since TMWRNJ came to an end (Rich opens the set with "Old Mr Lee! Old Mr Lee! Can Stewart come out to play?") and the effective lack of a television career for either comedian since. (Stewart Lee has since returned to the screen on Stewart Lee's Comedy Vehicle on BBC Two).

Highlights of the reunion show included a performance of the TMWRNJ theme song by TV's Emma Kennedy's band Vaginal Tap and the return of Paul Putner as The Curious Orange.

DVD release

In 2014 Richard Herring wrote that he was attempting to acquire the rights of TMWRNJ from the BBC to release the two series on DVD. However, in February 2015 he announced that the release would now not be happening, saying "It's not happening and I doubt it ever will, Nothing you or I can do about it." In an interview with Mustard'' magazine, Stewart Lee explained that the DVD's cancellation was due to a financial decision and his reluctance to fund what he considers a vanity project at this time. Lee does not however, rule out its future release.

Notes

References

External links
 Comedy Guide

Fist of Fun.net fansite, includes downloads of their radio shows and live performances, episode guides, interviews, links to full episodes, etc.
Lee and Herring.com
Official Stewart Lee website
Stewart Lee's website links to full episodes Stewart Lee's site now has links to all of the full episodes of the show, hosted on YouTube
Official Richard Herring website
YouTube clip
YouTube clip

BBC television comedy
1990s British comedy television series
1998 British television series debuts
1999 British television series endings
Portrayals of Jesus on television
Cultural depictions of Nostradamus